Aly-Us is a house music group from New Jersey that was active mostly in the early 1990s. Their most famous record was “Follow Me” from 1992.

Members and history
Aly-Us originally started as trio composed of vocalist “Supa” aka Eddie L. Lewis, DJ Kyle “Small” Smith, and vocalist William Brian Jennings, and was active until 1996. Lewis revived the name Aly-Us on its own in the early 2010s.

“Follow Me”

“Follow Me”, a deep house track produced and mixed by Kyle Smith, and executive produced by DJ Pierre and George Morel, was released in 1992 on the Strictly Rhythm record label. The record became an underground club hit and is considered one of the classics of the house genre for its uplifting spirit and "its unapologetically optimistic lyrics".

Remixes and features 
In 2002, a Full Intention remix to “Follow Me” peaked at #8 on Billboard's Dance Club Songs chart.

In 2012, the English electronic band Hot Chip named the song one of its essential summer cookout songs.

In 2016, the track was included on NPR’s playlist commemorating the Pulse nightclub terrorist attack in Orlando, Florida. Moby included the track on an accompanying double-CD to his recent memoir.

Parisian-born DJ and producer Erik Hagleton remixed the song in 2017.

See also
Club Zanzibar – historic black electronic music venue in Newark
Tony Humphries (musician)
New Jersey house

Weblinks
 Artist page on Discogs
 Biography of Aly-Us on Allmusic

References

American house music groups
Musical groups from New Jersey